This is a list of VTV dramas released in 2019.

←2018 - 2019 - 2020→

VTV Special Tet dramas
This drama airs from 21:40 to 22:30, 1st to 4th lunar-new-year days on VTV1.

VTV1 Weeknight Prime-time dramas
New time slot in 2019 as VTV resizes the duration from 45 minutes down to 30 minutes. It was sampled with 2017 drama Lặng yên dưới vực sâu (adjusted from 32 original episodes to 40 episodes) before officially launched.

These dramas air from 21:00 to 21:30, Monday to Friday on VTV1.

VTV3 Weeknight Prime-time dramas

First line-up
These dramas air from 20:00 to 20:30, Monday to Thursday on VTV3.

Second line-up

Monday-Tuesday dramas
These dramas air from 21:30 to 22:20, Monday and Tuesday on VTV3.

Wednesday–Thursday dramas
These dramas air from 21:30 to 22:20, Wednesday and Thursday on VTV3.

VTV3 Weekend Afternoon dramas
These dramas air from 14:00 to 14:50, Saturday and Sunday on VTV3.

Non-recurring dramas
These drama was warehoused and now released on VTV channels in the time slots that's originally made for another program or playback dramas.

See also
 List of dramas broadcast by Vietnam Television (VTV)
 List of dramas broadcast by Hanoi Radio Television (HanoiTV)
 List of dramas broadcast by Vietnam Digital Television (VTC)
List of television programmes broadcast by Vietnam Television (VTV)

References

External links
VTV.gov.vn – Official VTV Website 
VTV.vn – Official VTV Online Newspaper 

Vietnam Television original programming
2019 in Vietnamese television